Tom Joseph (1 January 1980 in Kozhikode) is an Indian former volleyball player who played for India in many international competitions. He is currently the head coach of Prime Volleyball League team Hyderabad Black Hawks. He got the Arjuna Award in 2014 for his great performance in volleyball throughout the year.

Early life 
He was born on 1 January 1980 in Kozhikode.

Career 
He led the Indian National Volleyball Team during the Rashid Memorial International Volleyball Tournament held in Dubai in 2000 when it won the gold medal. Joseph represented India in two Asian Games and four Asian Volleyball Championships. He also played at the 2009 World championship qualifiers in Tehran. At the national level championships, Joseph played for his home state Kerala and helped Kerala winning the National Volleyball Championship in more than one occasions.

Awards 

 Arjuna Award - 2014
 GV Raja Award - 2013
 Jimmy George Award - 2009
 JCI International Award - 2010
 Youth Icon Award - 2014
 Veera Maruthi Puraskaram - 2013
 E.S Kunjikilavan Master Puraskaram - 2013
 Pattiam Gopalan Award - 2013
 Ekalavya Puraskaram - 2013
 Chattambi Swami Puraskaram - 2013
 Janasakthi Puraskaram - 2013
 T Govindan Kayika Puraskaram - 2013
 Sportsmanship Award USA, Miami - 2014
 Vocational Excellence Award by Rotary Club - 2014
 5th KIES State Excel Award - 2016
 Sreerama Puraskaram - 2018

References

Living people
Sportspeople from Kozhikode
Indian men's volleyball players
Asian Games competitors for India
Volleyball players at the 2002 Asian Games
Volleyball players at the 2006 Asian Games
Recipients of the Arjuna Award
Volleyball players from Kerala
1980 births